Frederick L. "Toby" Bluth (July 11, 1940 – October 31, 2013) was a Texas-born American illustrator who worked on many Disney films and others as animator, background artist, and production designer. He had a long career writing and illustrating children's books, as well as performing and directing, nearly one hundred musicals, both on Broadway and off. His artwork is prominently displayed at most of the Disney theme parks around the world. He was the younger brother of Don Bluth, whom he collaborated with on both theater and animation.

Style
Gustaf Tenggren was a big inspiration throughout Bluth's career. When asked how he approached each of his watercolor masterpieces, Toby described his intent as

Creating the moment that you think you saw ... How one remembers a film is often different from the actual film itself.

In addition to his work on Disney films, Bluth created a large portfolio of erotic gay art, as well as commissioned illustrations for gay businesses and publications like The Advocate.

Death
He died on October 31, 2013 [Halloween] in Los Angeles, California following a stroke.  He was survived by his older brother Don Bluth.

Filmography

References

External links
Artist Official Disney Fine Art Site

Artist's Official Site

1940 births
2013 deaths
20th-century American painters
American male painters
American animated film directors
21st-century American painters
Animators from Texas
Background artists
Walt Disney Animation Studios people
Don Bluth
Place of birth missing
Prop designers
American storyboard artists
American art directors
American production designers
American people of Swedish descent
American people of English descent
American people of Irish descent
American people of Scottish descent
American people of German descent
Gay male erotica artists
American gay artists
Pseudonymous artists